3133 Sendai, provisional designation , is a stony Flora asteroid from the inner regions of the asteroid belt, approximately 8 kilometers in diameter. It was discovered on 4 October 1907, by German astronomer August Kopff at Heidelberg Observatory in southwest Germany. The asteroid was named for the Japanese city of Sendai.

Orbit and classification 

Sendai is a member of the Flora family, one of the largest groups of stony asteroids in the main-belt. It orbits the Sun in the inner main-belt at a distance of 1.8–2.5 AU once every 3 years and 3 months (1,176 days). Its orbit has an eccentricity of 0.16 and an inclination of 7° with respect to the ecliptic.

Physical characteristics 

Sendai has been characterized as a stony S-type asteroid.

Diameter and albedo 

According to the surveys carried out by NASA's Wide-field Infrared Survey Explorer and its extended NEOWISE mission, the asteroid's surface has an albedo of 0.21 and 0.31, with a diameter of 8.3 and 7.3 kilometers, respectively. The Collaborative Asteroid Lightcurve Link assumes an intermediate albedo of 0.24 – which derives from 8 Flora, the largest member and namesake of this orbital family – and calculates a concurring diameter of 7.5 kilometers.

Lightcurves 

In 2010, two rotational lightcurves were obtained by amateur astronomer Ralph Megna at Goat Mountain Astronomical Research Station (G79), and by the U.S. Palomar Transient Factory in California.

Naming 

This minor planet was named for the second largest city north of Tokyo, Sendai (pop. 1 million), location of the Tōhoku University. It is the home of the Sendai Astronomical Observatory, which was founded in 1955, on appeal by the Sendai Amateur Astronomical Association. The observatory has discovered several minor planets. The official naming citation was published by the Minor Planet Center on 29 September 1985 .

Notes

References

External links 
 Ralph Megna, Light-curves, website
 Asteroid Lightcurve Database (LCDB), query form (info )
 Dictionary of Minor Planet Names, Google books
 Asteroids and comets rotation curves, CdR – Observatoire de Genève, Raoul Behrend
 Discovery Circumstances: Numbered Minor Planets (1)-(5000) – Minor Planet Center
 
 

003133
Discoveries by August Kopff
Named minor planets
19071004